Yeremy Jesús Pino Santos (born 20 October 2002), sometimes known as just Yeremy, is a Spanish professional footballer who plays mainly as a right winger for La Liga club Villarreal and the Spain national team.

Club career
Yeremy was born in Las Palmas, Canary Islands, and joined UD Las Palmas' youth setup in 2014, after representing AD Huracán and Barrio Atlántico CF. On 22 June 2017, after refusing an offer from FC Barcelona, he signed for Villarreal CF.

Yeremy made his senior debut with the C-team on 24 August 2019, coming on as a second-half substitute for Fer Niño and scoring the third of a 3–0 Tercera División away win against CF Recambios Colón. After finishing his first senior season with three goals in 20 appearances, he was promoted to the reserves in Segunda División B.

After spending the pre-season with the first team under Unai Emery, Pino made his professional debut on 22 October 2020, replacing Francis Coquelin in a 5–3 UEFA Europa League win over Sivasspor. He made his La Liga debut three days later, again from the bench in a 0–0 draw at Cádiz CF.

Yeremy scored his first professional goal on 29 October 2020, netting the equalizer in a 3–1 away success over Qarabağ FK also in the European competition. On 12 November, he renewed his contract with the club until 2024.

On 26 May 2021, he played in the 2021 UEFA Europa League Final, to become the youngest Spanish player to start a major European final, aged 18 years and 218 days, breaking the previous record of Iker Casillas in the 2000 UEFA Champions League Final, aged 19 years and 4 days. He also became the youngest player to win the competition, eclipsing the record set by Robin van Persie in the 2002 UEFA Cup Final.

Yeremy scored four times on 27 February 2022 as Villarreal won 5–1 at home to RCD Espanyol, having only two goals for the season to his name before the game. He also became the youngest player to score a hat-trick in the first half of a La Liga match.

International career
Yeremy represented Spain at under-17 and under-18 levels, also acting as team captain for the latter side. Due to the isolation of some national team players following the positive COVID-19 test of Sergio Busquets, Spain's under-21 squad were called up for the international friendly against Lithuania on 8 June 2021. 

Yeremy made his debut for the senior squad on 6 October 2021 in the Nations League semi-final against Italy, replacing the injured Ferran Torres after 49 minutes in a 2–1 victory; four days later he came off the bench in a defeat by the same score in the final against France. The following 29 March, he made his first start in a friendly against Iceland in A Coruña, heading his first goal in a 5–0 win.

Career statistics

Club

International

Scores and results list Spain's goal tally first.

Honours
Villarreal
 UEFA Europa League: 2020–21

Spain
 UEFA Nations League runner-up: 2020–21

References

External links
 Profile at the Villarreal CF website
 
 

2002 births
Living people
Footballers from Las Palmas
Spanish footballers
Association football wingers
Spain international footballers
Spain youth international footballers
Spain under-21 international footballers
Tercera División players
La Liga players
Villarreal CF C players
Villarreal CF players
UEFA Europa League winning players
2022 FIFA World Cup players